Geodermatophilus normandii is a Gram-positive bacterium from the genus Geodermatophilus which has been isolated from desert sand from Ouré Cassoni in Chad.

References

Bacteria described in 2013
Actinomycetia